Kristina Erman (born 28 June 1993) is a Slovenian left back currently playing for Fortuna Sittard playing in the Dutch Eredivisie.

Career
In May 2021, Erman signed with ÍBV of the Icelandic top-tier Úrvalsdeild kvenna.

International goals

Honours 
Twente 
Winner
 Eredivisie: 2015–16

Runner-up
 Eredivisie: 2016–17

Torres
Runner-up
 Serie A: 2013–14
 Italian Women's Cup: 2013–14

ŽNK Krka
Winner
 Slovenian Women's League: 2010–11

References

External links 
 

1993 births
Living people
Slovenian women's footballers
Women's association football midfielders
Slovenia women's international footballers
FC Twente (women) players
Eredivisie (women) players
Expatriate women's footballers in the Netherlands
ŽNK Mura players
Ferencvárosi TC (women) footballers
ŽNK Krka players
ÍBV women's football players
Úrvalsdeild kvenna (football) players
Pomigliano C.F. players
Torres Calcio Femminile players
Expatriate women's footballers in Italy
Serie A (women's football) players
Slovenian expatriate sportspeople in Hungary
Slovenian expatriate sportspeople in Italy
Slovenian expatriate sportspeople in Norway
PSV (women) players
Slovenian expatriate sportspeople in the Netherlands
Expatriate women's footballers in Norway
Expatriate women's footballers in Hungary
Expatriate women's footballers in Iceland
Slovenian expatriate sportspeople in Iceland
Fortuna Sittard (women) players